Motohiko Ban (1 January 1905 – 3 September 1998) was a Japanese ski jumper. He competed in the individual event at the 1928 Winter Olympics.

References

1905 births
1998 deaths
Japanese male ski jumpers
Olympic ski jumpers of Japan
Ski jumpers at the 1928 Winter Olympics
Sportspeople from Kyoto